Banks High School is a public high school in Banks, Oregon, United States.

History

•During the Great Depression, the Works Progress Administration paid for work on the school's athletic fields. The project was completed in 1936.

•2018 4a Oregon State Football Champions. 31–20 win over Seaside at Hillsboro Stadium. (11-1 overall Record). 
Head Coach - Cole W. Linehan
Assistant Coaches - Steve Lyda, Jason Tufts, Chad Delaney, Dane Ebanez, Wymon Smith, Kurt Victor, Chad Graham.

•In 2019, the Banks Braves Baseball team beat Henley High School (Klamath Falls, Oregon) in the State championship. They became the 2nd school in over a century to win the football state championship, basketball state championship, and the baseball state championship in the same year.

•Banks High school, as well as the middle and elementary schools within the town share a common "school mascot". They refer to themselves as the Banks Braves.

Academics
In 2008, 86% of the school's seniors received a high school diploma. Of 102 students, 88 graduated, ten dropped out, and four were still in high school the following year.

Notable alumni
Darleen Ortega, judge
 Kimberley Strassel, writer

References

High schools in Washington County, Oregon
Works Progress Administration in Oregon
Public high schools in Oregon
Banks, Oregon